Que Rei Sou Eu? (English: What King Am I?) is a 1989 Brazilian telenovela created by Cassiano Gabus Mendes. It stars Edson Celulari and Giulia Gam in the lead roles.

Cast 
 Edson Celulari as Jean-Pierre
 Giulia Gam as Aline
 Tato Gabus Mendes as Pichot / Lucien Élan / Rei Petrus III
 Tereza Rachel as Rainha Valentine de Avillan
 Antônio Abujamra as Mestre Ravengar
 Natália do Vale  as Suzanne Webert
 Cláudia Abreu as Princesa Juliette de Avillan
 Daniel Filho as Bergeron Bouchet / André Barral
 Marieta Severo as Madeleine Bouchet
 Jorge Dória as Vanolli Berval
 Aracy Balabanian as Maria Fromet / Lenoir Gaillard
 Stênio Garcia as Corcoran
 Ítala Nandi as Loulou Lion
 Edney Giovenazzi as François Gaillard
 Carlos Augusto Strazzer as Crespy Aubriet
 Zilka Salaberry as Gaby
 Fábio Sabag as Roger Webert
 John Herbert as Bidet Lambert
 Vera Holtz as Fanny
 Oswaldo Loureiro as Gaston Marny
 Laerte Morrone as Gérard Laugier
 Ísis de Oliveira as Lucy Laugier
 Mila Moreira as Zmirá
 Marcelo Picchi as Michel, o Marquês de Lafitti
 Betty Gofman as Princesa Ingrid
 Guilherme Leme as Roland Barral
 Cristina Prochaska as Charlotte
 Paulo César Grande as Bertrand
 Cinira Camargo as Lily
 Carla Daniel as Cozette
 Marcos Breda as Pimpim
 Yolanda Cardoso as Miruska
 Ivan Setta as Godard
 Heloísa Helena as Cocote
 Luiz Magnelli as Arauto Arnúbio
 Desireé Vignolli as Denise
 José Carlos Sanches as Balesteros
 Totia Meirelles as Monah
 Soraya Ravenle as Anete
 Cacá Barrete as Vadi
 Melise Maia as Janine

References

External links 
 Que Rei Sou Eu? at IMDb

Brazilian telenovelas
TV Globo telenovelas
Comedy telenovelas
1989 telenovelas
1989 Brazilian television series debuts
1989 Brazilian television series endings
Portuguese-language telenovelas